King of the Hill is an animated television series.

King of the Hill may also refer to:

Games 
 King of the Hill (game), a children's game and related uses
 King of the Hill (board game), a race game
 King Of The Hill pairing system, a distinct variation of the Swiss-system tournament pairing system
 King of the Hill (chess), a chess variant
 King of the Hill (2000 computer game), a game based on the show from 1997.

Film and television 
 King of the Hill (1993 film), a film by Steven Soderbergh
 King of the Hill (2007 film) or The King of the Mountain, a Spanish thriller
 "King of the Hill" (The Simpsons), an episode of The Simpsons
 King of the Hill, a 1975 game show pilot hosted by Robert Earle
 "King of the Hill" (Cheers), an episode of the television series Cheers

Other media 
 King of the Hill (soundtrack), a 1999 soundtrack album from the TV series
 King of the Hill, a memoir by A. E. Hotchner; basis for the 1993 film
 "King of the Hill", a song by Quiet Riot from QR
 "King of the Hill", a song by Roger McGuinn from the album Back from Rio
 "King of the Hill", a song by Minutemen from the EP Project Mersh
 "King of the Hill", a song by Westside Connection from Bow Down
 "King of the Hill!", an issue of The Transformers comic book series

Other uses 
 King of the Hill, the prototype name for the Chevrolet Corvette ZR-1
 King of the Hills Gold Mine, the current name for what was known as Tarmoola Gold Mine in Western Australia

See also 
 King of the Mountain (disambiguation)
 KOTH (disambiguation)